Thomas Grove (c. 1609 – 27 January 1692) was an English  politician who sat in the House of Commons at various times between 1645 and 1660. 
  
Grove was the son of Robert Grove of Mere, Wiltshire and his wife Honor South, daughter of Thomas South of Swallowcliffe, also in Wiltshire. He was a student of Middle Temple in 1627. He was of Ferne House, Donhead St Mary, Wiltshire.

In 1645, he was elected Member of Parliament for Milborne Port in Somerset as a recruiter to the Long Parliament. In December 1648 he was one of the Members excluded in Pride's Purge. He was MP for Wiltshire in the First Protectorate Parliament in 1654 and in the Second Protectorate Parliament in 1656. In 1659 he was elected MP for Marlborough in the Third Protectorate Parliament. He was elected for MP for Shaftesbury, Dorset in the Convention Parliament of 1660.

References

1600s births
1692 deaths
Year of birth uncertain
Members of the Parliament of England (pre-1707) for Wiltshire
English MPs 1640–1648
English MPs 1654–1655
English MPs 1656–1658
English MPs 1659
English MPs 1660
Members of the Middle Temple

External links